Silves is a railway station on the Algarve line which serves Silves, Portugal. It opened on the 1st of February 1902.

References 

Railway stations in Portugal
Railway stations opened in 1902